Time Flies may refer to:

 Tempus fugit, a Latin phrase usually translated as "time flies"; an admonition against procrastination

Film
 Time Flies (1944 film), a British comedy directed by Walter Forde
 Time Flies (2013 film), a Canadian short drama film directed by Stéphane Moukarzel

Music
 Timeflies, an American pop-rap duo

Albums
 Time Flies (Billy Ray Cyrus album) or the title song, 2003
 Time Flies (John Michael Montgomery album), 2008
 Time Flies (Ladyhawke album) or the title song, 2021
 Time Flies (Melanie Laine album) or the title song, 2005
 Time Flies (Nogizaka46 album), 2021
 Time Flies (Vaya Con Dios album) or the title song, 1992
 Time Flies... The Best of Huey Lewis & the News, 1996
 Time Flies... 1994–2009, by Oasis, 2010
 Time Flies, by Eason Chan, 2010

Songs
 "Time Flies" (Drake song), 2020
 "Time Flies" (Porcupine Tree song), 2009
 "Time Flies", by Burna Boy from Twice as Tall, 2020
 "Time Flies", by Lower Than Atlantis from Changing Tune, 2012
 "Time Flies", by Puddle of Mudd from Life on Display, 2003
 "Time Flies", by Rico Nasty, 2019

Other uses 
 Time Flies (comics), a 1990–1996 comic by Garth Ennis and Philip Bond
 Hawks Miller HM-1, named Time Flies, a 1936 American racing aircraft

See also
 Time Flies By, a 2012 album by Country Joe McDonald
 "Time Flies By (When You're the Driver of a Train)", a 1985 song by Half Man Half Biscuit from Back in the DHSS
 "Time flies like an arrow; fruit flies like a banana", a humorous example of syntactic ambiguity
 Tempus fugit (disambiguation)